Ludwig Thiersch (April 12, 1825 in Munich – May 10, 1909) was a German painter, primarily of mythological and religious subjects and especially of ecclesiastical art, also influential in Greece.

Early life
Thiersch was born in Munich, the son of classicist and philhellene Friedrich Thiersch, and brother of surgeon Karl Thiersch and theologian H. W. J. Thiersch. He attended the Academy of Fine Arts, Munich to study sculpture, but after a few years turned to painting, in which he became a student of Heinrich Maria von Hess, Julius Schnorr von Carolsfeld, and Karl Schorn. After the Academy, he painted a depiction of Sakuntala (1848) and a scene of Camisards, and then traveled to Rome, where he sketched scenes from daily Italian life and painted Hiob unter seinen Freunden.

In Athens, 1852–1855
In 1852, he traveled with his father to Athens, where he replaced Rafaello Ceccoli (fl.1830s-1850s) at the Athens School of Fine Arts and became interested in Byzantine art.  He painted several frescoes in Greek churches, and was at the forefront of a movement to "modernize" Byzantine art by introducing elements from Western art such as naturalistic perspective and anatomy. In this, he is sometimes credited with discovering Byzantine art for the world of modern art, but such reform was controversial in Greece, finding fierce opposition from those opposed to what they saw as attempts to replace longstanding Greek traditions with foreign ones.

Several newspaper editorials opposed Thiersch's appointment as Professor, and continued to oppose his receipt of commissions to paint church frescoes. However, Westernizing reforms were favored by the Bavarian monarchy of King Otto, as well as by Lysandros Kaftanzoglou, a prominent architect and head of the Athens Polytechnic, and so his opponents were largely unsuccessful.

Among Thiersch's pupils during his years in Athens was Kleoniki Gennadiou and most notably Nikolaos Gyzis, who would become one of the best-known Greek painters of the 19th century, and who would manage to engage Western traditions while still producing art seen as authentically Greek.  Thiersch's most notable fresco in Athens is in the Church of Saint Nikodimos.

Vienna, Rome, Saint Petersburg, Bavaria, and London

Through the rest of his life, Thiersch traveled from city to city, being employed alternately to paint church frescoes and to produce oil paintings for private patrons. His church art is particularly notable, and together with Ludwig Seitz and Jean-Hippolyte Flandrin, he is considered to have led a revival in western European ecclesiastical art.

In 1856, Thiersch was appointed to a position in Vienna, where he continued to paint church frescoes. During this period Theophil Freiherr von Hansen, a Danish-Austrian architect who had also spent time in Greece and taken up an interest in Byzantine art, was rebuilding Vienna's Fleischmarkt Greek Church in a neo-Byzantine style, and Thiersch was commissioned along with Karl Rahl to supply frescoes for the interior.

Following the position in Vienna, Thiersch was employed in Rome by Simon Sinas, a Greek philanthropist, for whom he produced a number of works on mythological and religious subjects, including Charon als Seelenführer, Bakchos' Einzug in den Hain von Kolonos, and Thetis' Klage um Achilleus.

In 1860, he went to Saint Petersburg, where he painted frescoes and icons in the chapels of Grand Duke Nicholas and Grand Duke Michael, and in the Protestant Church of Saint Catherine.

After his return to Germany, Thiersch painted Auferweckung der Tochter des Jairus und Christus in Gethsemane (1866) for the Stiftskirche in Kempten, as well as Predigt des Paulus auf dem Areopag, and in the following years a number of other works, including Christus am Teich Bethesda, Ceres, die ihre Tochter sucht, Christus in der Wüste, Alarich in Athen als Sieger gefeiert, and Kreuztragung Christi.

Some years later, Thiersch painted the icons in the iconostasis of the Greek Orthodox Cathedral of St. Sophia in London (consecrated 1882), and of St. Stephen's Greek Orthodox Church in Paris (consecrated 1895).

References

Sources 

 
 
 
 
 
 
 

1825 births
1909 deaths
Artists from Munich
19th-century German painters
19th-century German male artists
German male painters
20th-century German painters
20th-century German male artists
Academy of Fine Arts, Munich alumni
Academic staff of the Athens School of Fine Arts